The Alabama Crimson Tide college football team represents the University of Alabama in the West Division of the Southeastern Conference (SEC). The Crimson Tide competes as part of the NCAA Division I Football Bowl Subdivision. The program has had 27 head coaches, and 1 interim head coach, since it began play during the 1892 season. Since January 2007, Nick Saban has served as Alabama's head coach.

Adopting the nickname of the Crimson Tide after the 1907 season, the team has played more than 1,100 games over 119 seasons. In that time, 12 coaches have led the Crimson Tide in postseason bowl games: Wallace Wade, Frank Thomas, Harold Drew, Bear Bryant, Ray Perkins, Bill Curry, Gene Stallings, Mike DuBose, Dennis Franchione, Mike Shula, Joe Kines, and Saban. Eight of those coaches also won conference championships: Wade captured four as a member of the Southern Conference and Thomas, Drew, Bryant, Curry, Stallings, DuBose, and Saban won a combined 25 as a member of the SEC. During their tenures, Wade, Thomas, Bryant, Stallings, and Saban each won national championships with the Crimson Tide.

Bryant is the leader in seasons coached and games won, with 232 victories during his 25 years with the program.  Saban has the highest winning percentage of those who have coached more than one game, with .866. Jennings B. Whitworth has the lowest winning percentage of those who have coached more than one game, with .166. Mike Price, who was hired in 2003, was fired prior to coaching a game. Of the 28 different head coaches who have led the Crimson Tide, Wade, Thomas, Bryant, and Stallings have been inducted into the College Football Hall of Fame.

Key

Coaches

Notes

References 
General

 
 

Specific

Lists of college football head coaches

Alabama Crimson Tide football coaches